The Yorkshire Esk Trail, also Yorkshire Esk Way, is a 32-mile scenic walk, normally to be covered in three stages, that follows the course of the River Esk in North Yorkshire, from its sources in Westerdale to the sea in Whitby. The route was researched in 2014, and featured in the book The Classic Walks; Northern Yorkshire Coast and Moors published in January 2015 which coincided with the trail's opening.

A regional route, the Esk Valley Way, already existed, but the Yorkshire Esk Trail was devised to overcome perceived shortcomings in the RR.

The Trail's first leg follows country lanes from Castleton to Westerdale village, then uses footpaths and lanes to reach open moorland.  Unlike the RR, it runs very close to the multiple tiny sources of the Esk, then follows the river to Castleton Station.

Stage 2 is a linear route from Castleton Station to Egton Bridge Station (on the Esk Valley railway line).  The stage follows bridleways and footpaths to Danby, then a country lane to the landmark Danby Beacon.  A moorland footpath gives access to more paths to Lealholm, then the railway accompanies walkers closely to Glaisdale. A final stretch along a paved packhorse trod rises high above the Esk en route to Egton Bridge.  There is an optional crossing of the river on stepping stones near the station.

Stage 3 is another linear walk, from Egton Bridge Station to Whitby. A former toll road, now a permissive track, takes walkers beside the river and railway to the outskirts of Grosmont, then paths over fields and rougher ground lead to Sleights.  An elevated scenic stretch beside fields follows to Ruswarp, where the Trail joins a permissive path between the railway and river.  On the approach to Whitby, walkers pass under one of the most striking features of the walk, the Victorian Larpool Viaduct. Finally, the river debouches into the North Sea in Whitby's scenic harbour.  A train can be caught back to the day's start point.

References

Further reading 
 

Footpaths in North Yorkshire
Long-distance footpaths in England